The 1839 Martinique earthquake occurred on the morning of January 11 with an estimated magnitude of 7.8 , the largest in the Lesser Antilles since 1690. The maximum intensity of this earthquake was assigned IX on both the Mercalli and MSK intensity scales, which left the cities of Saint-Pierre and Fort Royal almost completely destroyed. Estimation on the number of human losses varies from 390 to even 4,000 making this one of the deadliest earthquakes in the Caribbean.

Four years later, the Guadeloupe earthquake with an estimated magnitude 8.5 struck the same region with a human toll between 1,500 and 6,000. It is believed to have originated on the same source fault and may have been related to the eruptions of Mount Pelée in 1851 and 1902.

Tectonic setting 
The Lesser Antilles subduction zone marks the boundary where the North American Plate subducts or dives beneath the Caribbean Plate at ~2 cm/yr along the subduction interface. Interaction between these two lithospheres can sometimes produce megathrust earthquakes although there has been no recent megathrust quakes on the fault other than the 1839 and 1843 events. Moderately large earthquakes have occurred near the megathrust in recent years but none on the megathrust. Since 1973, there have only been just a little over 30 thrust earthquakes on the subduction zone with magnitudes around the 5.0 range. A plausible explanation for this is the slow rate of convergence resulting in the megathrust becoming seismically devoid of activity for hundreds to thousands of years before rupturing in great quakes. A similar effect was seen prior to the 2004 Sumatra-Andaman earthquake, and in Japan's Nankai Trough and the Cascadia subduction zone. At the present moment, the Lesser Antilles subduction zone has been determined to be locked and has the potential to generate an earthquake of 8.95 to 9.58.

Earthquake 
The earthquake of 1839 had a probable epicenter located east of Martinique, where intensity IX was felt throughout the island. On the island of Saint Lucia and Dominica, intensity IX persisted, but weakened to VIII at the southern and northern part of the islands respectively. Level VIII to VI was felt in Guadeloupe and on Saint Vincent and the Grenadines. Barbados was hit with VII shaking. Weaker intensities of V and lesser was felt in the northern Lesser Antilles and in Venezuela, Guyana and Suriname.

It is believed that the megathrust ruptured for 140 km and had an average slip of 8 meters.

Impact 
The morning of January 11 in Martinique was disrupted by three instances of violent shaking which varied in duration from 30 seconds to two minutes. The earthquake was felt throughout the Lesser Antilles but the most serious damage was on the island of Martinique. At Fort Royal, the entire city was near totally destroyed. Of the 800 buildings, only 50 to 60 were still safe for occupancy, with 600 completely collapsed and the other 200 partially destroyed. Hotels, a theater, artillery barracks, hospital, and official buildings were among the infrastructures destroyed. The earthquake also damaged the aqueduct which supplies the city with water. Heaps of rubble up to three meters high was left in the quake's aftermath. The devastation was great due to the city being built on marshlands rather than on a stable rocky base.

Other cities saw serious destruction but not as severe like in Fort Royal. An area in Saint-Pierre was heavily affected where all but two or three houses were left standing. In other parts of the island, churches and stone construction collapsed in the quake. About 300 to 4,000 people died from the earthquake, this was because officials had not counted the number of slaves killed to avoid compensation requests by their owners.

Like the earthquake which occurred in 1843, no tsunami was generated.

See also 
 List of earthquakes in the Caribbean
 History of Martinique

References 

1839 in France
Earthquakes in Martinique
Earthquakes in the Caribbean
Megathrust earthquakes
19th century in Martinique
Martinique articles
1839 disasters in North America
Natural disasters in Martinique
Earthquakes in Dominica
Earthquakes in Saint Lucia
1839 natural disasters